Earith Bridge railway station was a station in Earith, Cambridgeshire on the Ely and St Ives Railway.  It was closed to regular passenger trains in 1931 but occasional excursions used it until 1958.

The station had a single platform, a signal box, and a goods loop.

References

External links
 Earith Bridge station on navigable 1946 O. S. map
 Earith Bridge station on Subterranea Britannica

Former Great Eastern Railway stations
Disused railway stations in Cambridgeshire
Railway stations in Great Britain opened in 1878
Railway stations in Great Britain closed in 1931